In :Category theory and related fields of mathematics, an envelope is a construction that generalizes the operations of "exterior completion", like completion of a locally convex space, or Stone–Čech compactification of a topological space. A dual construction is called refinement.

Definition 

 
 
Notations:

 

 

Nets of epimorphisms and functoriality 

Suppose that to each object  in a category  it is assigned a subset  in the class
 for each object  the set  is non-empty and is directed to the left with respect to the pre-order inherited from 
 
 for each object  the covariant system of morphisms generated by   
 
 for each morphism  and for each element  there are an element  and a morphism  such that 
 
Then the family of sets  is called a net of epimorphisms in the category .

Examples.
The system of natural mappings  is a net of epimorphisms in the category  of locally convex topological vector spaces.  
 For each locally convex topological algebra  and for each submultiplicative closed convex balanced neighbourhood of zero , 
 ,
The system of natural mappings  is a net of epimorphisms in the category  of locally convex topological algebras.  

Theorem. Let  be a net of epimorphisms in a category  that generates a class of morphisms  on the inside:
 
 
the following holds:
 
(ii) the envelope  can be defined as a functor.

Theorem. Let  be a net of epimorphisms in a  category  that generates a class of morphisms  on the inside:
 
Then for any monomorphically complementable class of epimorphisms  in  such that  is co-well-powered in  the envelope  can be defined as a functor.

Theorem.
Suppose a category  and a class of objects  have the following properties:
(i)  is cocomplete,
(ii)  has nodal decomposition,
(iii)  is co-well-powered in the class ,
(iv)  goes from :
 ,
(v)  differs morphisms on the outside: for any two different parallel morphisms  there is a morphism  such that ,
(vi)  is closed with respect to passage to colimits,
(vii)  is closed with respect to passage from the codomain of a morphism to its nodal image: if , then .
Then the envelope  can be defined as a functor.

Examples 
In the following list all envelopes can be defined as functors.
 1. Obviously,  is the inverse limit of the quotient Banach spaces  (defined above):

 2.
 3. The algebra  is the inverse limit of the quotient Banach algebras  (defined above):

 4.
 5.
 6.

Applications 

Envelopes appear as standard functors in various fields of mathematics. Apart from the examples given above, 

In abstract harmonic analysis the notion of envelope plays a key role in the generalizations of the Pontryagin  duality theory to the classes of non-commutative groups: the holomorphic, the smooth and the continuous envelopes of stereotype algebras (in the  examples given above) lead respectively to the constructions of the holomorphic, the smooth and the continuous dualities in big geometric disciplines – complex geometry, differential geometry, and topology – for certain classes of (not necessarily commutative) topological groups considered in these disciplines (affine algebraic groups, and some classes of Lie groups and Moore groups).

See also
Refinement

Notes

References 

 

 

Category theory
Duality theories
Functional analysis